Cris Beam is an American writer. She is the author of nonfiction books on transgender teenagers, the U.S. foster system, and empathy, as well as a young adult novel and a short memoir.

Life
Beam was a volunteer teacher at EAGLES Academy for two and a half years, a former public high school for LGBT students in Los Angeles. She has an adoptive daughter.

Books

Transparent
In 2007, Beam published Transparent: Love, Family, and Living the T with Transgender Teenagers. The non-fiction book describes four transgender teenage girls; The New York Times said, "With sensitivity and a deep connection to the girls, Beam describes their struggles with transitioning and how they reconcile them with more familiar teenage concerns like crushes and cliques." Beam, a journalist from New York City, began the book after moving to Los Angeles where her partner was in graduate school and Beam began volunteering at a high school for gay and trans teenagers.

Transparent won the 2008 Transgender Lambda Literary Award and the American Library Association's Gay, Lesbian, Bisexual, and Transgender Round Table named it a Stonewall Honor Book for Nonfiction for 2008.

I Am J
In 2011, Beam published I Am J, a young adult novel which was named a finalist for the 2012 Lambda Literary Award for Transgender Fiction.

To the End of June
In 2013, Beam published To the End of June: The Intimate Life of American Foster Care. In the Chicago Tribune, Robin Erb called To the End of June a "a challenging and refreshing read" thanks to Beam's intention, in Beam's words, to make the book "be more descriptive than prescriptive, placing the why above the what next" [emphasis in the original] in her account of the system's problems. In The New York Times, Benoit Denizet-Lewis says, "Beam’s book is most gripping when she hangs out with foster children themselves. Just as she did in 'Transparent,' her excellent book about transgender teenagers in Los Angeles, Beam writes about social outcasts without stereotyping them. She gives them a much-needed voice and does what too many adults in the foster-care system can’t, or won’t: she advocates for them." But Denizet-Lewis also notes Beam's reporting suggests this advocacy "can provide only so much hope in a system that no one — 'not the kids, not the foster or biological parents, not the social workers, the administrators, the politicians, the policy experts' — thinks is working."

I Feel You

In 2018, Beam published the nonfiction book I Feel You: The Surprising Power of Extreme Empathy.

See also
LGBT culture in New York City
Literary analysis

References

Living people
American non-fiction writers
American LGBT writers
American women non-fiction writers
Year of birth missing (living people)
21st-century American LGBT people
21st-century American women